Balitoropsis ophiolepis is a species of ray-finned fish in the genus Balitoropsis. They can be found off of Sumatra, Borneo, and Java.

References

Balitoridae
Fish described in 1853